Empress Dowager Gao may refer to:

Empress Gao (Xuanwu) (died 518), empress of the Northern Wei dynasty
Empress Gao (Song dynasty) (1032–1093), empress of the Song dynasty

See also
Empress Gao (disambiguation)

Gao